Ross S. Sterling High School is a public high school located in Baytown, Texas and classified as a 6A school by the UIL. Sterling is a part of the Goose Creek Consolidated Independent School District which covers southeastern Harris County. The school was built in 1966 to accommodate the growing population of Baytown. It is named after Ross S. Sterling, co-founder of Humble Oil (now part of ExxonMobil) and 31st Governor of Texas.

In 2015, the school was rated "Met Standard" by the Texas Education Agency.

Sections of the city of Baytown are zoned to Sterling High School. Previously, sections of Highlands were until the Goose Creek Memorial High School was built in 2008.

Demographics
The 2014 School Membership Report shows that Sterling's ethnic breakdown includes:
1,237 (51%) Hispanic students
679 (28%) White students
412 (17%) African-American students
97 (4%) Asian-American, Indian, and other students

Feeder patterns
Elementary schools that feed into Sterling include
Clark
Crockett
Harlem
Austin
Bowie

The middle schools that feed into Sterling are
Gentry
Cedar Bayou

Athletics 
Ross S. Sterling High School competes in these sports - 

Volleyball, Cross Country, Football, Basketball, Water Polo, Swimming, Soccer, Golf, Tennis, Track, Baseball & Softball

Activities and clubs
Other activities available at Ross S. Sterling High School include:
Art
Band
Choir
Orchestra
Drama

Clubs available include:
Academic Lemmings
American Red Cross Club
Anime Club
Art Honour Society
Bowling Club
Chess Club
Club Avid
Christian Student Union
Creative Writing Club
Video Game Club
Interact Club
Diamond Dolls
Future Farmers of America
Future Teachers of America
Key Club
National Honor Society
Drama Club
French and Spanish Club
Go Green Club
Psychology Club
Lettermen's Club
Strategy Club

Academics
Sterling offers a wide range of courses. Along with the core courses, Sterling also offers many College Board AP courses.

Notable alumni
Mark Alford, member of the U.S. House of Representatives
Rocky Bernard, defensive tackle for the Seattle Seahawks who played in Super Bowl XL.
Chris Cagle, Country music singer and songwriter
Hunter Cervenka, Major League Baseball pitcher 
Jennifer Elrod, Federal Appellate Judge
Romany Malco, Actor Weeds, The 40-Year-Old Virgin
Brett Marshall, Major League Baseball pitcher 
Barry Smitherman, member of the Texas Railroad Commission
Darren Walker, president of the Ford Foundation

References

External links
 

Goose Creek Consolidated Independent School District high schools
Galveston Bay Area
Baytown, Texas
School buildings completed in 1966
Educational institutions established in 1966
1966 establishments in Texas